Magnus Pegel (or Pegelius or Pegelow) (15 May 1547 – 1619) was a German doctor and mathematician. Pegel was born in Rostock in Pomerania/Germany and was one of the first authors to write (in 1604) about the theory of blood transfusions.  He died at Stettin.

Works 

 "Disputatio de peste"
 "Universi seu mundi Diatyposis"
 "Thesaurus rerum selectarum"
 "Aphorismi thesum selectarum"

References 

1547 births
1619 deaths
16th-century German mathematicians
17th-century German mathematicians
16th-century German physicians
17th-century German physicians
16th-century German writers
16th-century German male writers
17th-century German writers
17th-century German male writers